William Addison Riner (June 26, 1878 – November 20, 1955) was a justice of the Wyoming Supreme Court from January 10, 1928, to November 20, 1955.

Born in Greene, Iowa, Riner practiced law in Michigan for less than a year before moving to Cheyenne, Wyoming in 1902. He was an active Republican Party member, and served as a city attorney, United States District Attorney, and district court judge. Riner was appointed to the Wyoming Supreme Court on January 10, 1928, by Governor Frank C. Emerson, to fill the vacancy caused by the death of Justice Charles N. Potter. Riner was then elected to the court, and re-elected in succeeding years, serving until his death.

References

External links
 The John A. Riner and William A. Riner papers at the American Heritage Center

Further reading
 "William A. Riner, Chief Justice of the Supreme Court of Wyoming", American Bar Association Journal (May 1950), p. 380-383.

Justices of the Wyoming Supreme Court
1878 births
1955 deaths
People from Butler County, Iowa